Welverdiend is a small town in West Rand District Municipality in the Gauteng province of South Africa. Town 85 km south-west of Johannesburg, just west of Carletonville.

References

Populated places in the Merafong City Local Municipality